The Bellbirds formed in 2009 in Auckland, New Zealand. The band consists of Sandy Mill: vocals, percussion, Victoria Kelly: vocals, piano, organ, Don McGlashan: vocals, guitar, various instruments and Sean Donnelly (also known as SJD): vocals, guitar, bass.  Sean Donnelly writes most of the songs.

An article in Stuff.co.nz says, "Having a bunch of songs that didn't fit into a "traditional band setting" gave birth to the Bellbirds."

They played at WOMAD New Zealand, Taranaki on 13 and 14 March 2010.

All four members of the Bellbirds are involved with the recording of Neil Finn's album Out of Silence, in August 2017.

References

External links
 Session on Radio NZ, 19 June 2010

Musical groups from Auckland
Musical groups established in 2009
Musical quartets